Henry Owens may refer to:
Henry Cole Owens (born 1992), American baseball pitcher
Henry Jay Owens (born 1979), American baseball pitcher
Henry Owens (born 1914), Scottish boxer who fought under the name "Jake Kilrain"

See also 
 Henry Owen (disambiguation)